Christoph Friedl (born 14 July 1992 in Austria) is an Austrian football player currently playing for SV Lafnitz. He has previously played for TSV Hartberg.

Honours

Club

SV Lafnitz
Austrian Regionalliga Central (1) 2017-18

References

Soccerway.com profile

1992 births
Austrian footballers
Association football midfielders
SV Lafnitz players
TSV Hartberg players
Living people